The 2019–2020 Championship League was a professional snooker tournament, taking place over most of the 2019-20 snooker season from 7 October 2019 to 5 March 2020 at the Morningside Arena in Leicester, England. The event features seven group stages before a finals stage in March 2020; the first four played in October, two in January, and the final group played in March. It was the 13th staging of the Championship League. The event featured a total prize fund of £182,400 with the winner receiving £20,700. The losing finalist received £6,000 more than the winner due to having played in all groups starting from Group 3.

Martin Gould was the defending champion, having won the 2019 edition of the tournament, beating Jack Lisowski 3–1 in the final. However, Gould did not participate in this event. Scott Donaldson won the tournament, having qualified from group four and defeated Graeme Dott 3–0 in the final. This was the first professional snooker title of Donaldson's career.

Tournament format

The Championship League was a professional snooker event that took place between 7 October 2019 to 5 March 2020 at the Morningside Arena in Leicester, England. All matches were the best of 5 , and played as a round-robin, with seven groups consisting of seven players. From each group the top four players qualified for a knockout round, the winner of which qualified for an eighth "winners group". The lowest two players of each group are eliminated and the remaining four move to the next group, where they are joined by three more participants.

The winners group is played in the same way, with the winner of the knockout phase named as champion, and a place at the 2020 Champion of Champions. The event was sponsored by sports betting company BetVictor;  and was broadcast via streaming on various betting websites, as well as on zhibo.tv in China.

Prize fund 
The breakdown of prize money for the 2019–20 Championship League is shown below.

Group 1–7
Winner: £3,000
Runner-up: £2,000
Semi-final: £1,000
Frame-win (league stage): £100
Frame-win (play-offs): £300
Highest break: £500

Winners' Group
Winner: £10,000
Runner-up: £5,000
Semi-final: £3,000
Frame-win (league stage): £200
Frame-win (play-offs): £300
Highest break: £1,000

Tournament total: £182,400

Tournament summary

Group 1 was played on 7 and 8 October 2019, where Neil Robertson defeated Ryan Day 3–2 in the final. The second group was played on 9 and 10 October, with Stuart Bingham defeating Mark Selby 3–1 to win the group. After this, Selby and Barry Hawkins declined to continue, and were replaced by Xiao Guodong and Ben Woollaston, but both were eliminated in the third group. Group 3 was played on 21 and 22 October 2019, with Gary Wilson defeating Kyren Wilson 3–0. The group 3 matches saw a record number of century breaks made in a Championship League group with a total of 24, beating the record of 23 from the previous year's Winners' Group.

The fourth group was played on 23 and 24 October 2019. Scott Donaldson defeated compatriot Graeme Dott 3–0 in the final. Group 5 was played on 6 and 7 January 2020. Mark Williams won all six of his group matches, but lost in the first round against David Gilbert 2–3. Anthony McGill defeated Gilbert in the final to win the group. On 8 and 9 January 2020 in group six; Judd Trump won after a 3–1 victory over Graeme Dott. Trump also made the highest break of the tournament, a 145 in group six. Group 7 was played on 2 and 3 March 2020. Dott defeated Williams 3–1 to be the last qualifier.

The Winners' Group was played on 4 and 5 March 2020. On the first day, Trump made his 700th career century break in his round-robin match against McGill. The four players who qualified from the Winner's Group were Trump, Dott, McGill and Donaldson. Donaldson defeated Trump 3–1, whilst Dott beat Williams 3–2. Donaldson won his first professional tournament with a 3–0 victory over Dott in the final. Due to the additional prizes for frame wins, Donaldson was awarded a total of £20,700 throughout the tournament.

Tournament draw

Group 1

 Luca Brecel 0–3 Mark Selby
 Barry Hawkins 3–1 Neil Robertson
 Jack Lisowski 1–3 Luca Brecel
 Jimmy Robertson 1–3 Ryan Day
 Mark Selby 1–3 Barry Hawkins
 Neil Robertson 0–3 Jimmy Robertson
 Luca Brecel 2–3 Barry Hawkins

 Ryan Day 2–3 Jack Lisowski
 Mark Selby 2–3 Neil Robertson
 Jimmy Robertson 3–2 Jack Lisowski
 Ryan Day 1–3 Neil Robertson
 Barry Hawkins 3–2 Jack Lisowski
 Luca Brecel 1–3 Ryan Day
 Mark Selby 3–1 Jimmy Robertson

 Barry Hawkins 3–2 Ryan Day
 Neil Robertson 3–1 Jack Lisowski
 Luca Brecel 3–2 Jimmy Robertson
 Mark Selby 0–3 Jack Lisowski
 Barry Hawkins 3–0 Jimmy Robertson
 Mark Selby 3–2 Ryan Day
 Luca Brecel 1–3 Neil Robertson

Table

Play-offs

Group 2

 Kyren Wilson 3–0 Stuart Bingham
 Gary Wilson 3–0 Jack Lisowski
 Barry Hawkins 2–3 Kyren Wilson
 Mark Selby 3–0 Ryan Day
 Stuart Bingham 3–1 Gary Wilson
 Jack Lisowski 0–3 Mark Selby
 Kyren Wilson 2–3 Gary Wilson

 Ryan Day 3–0 Barry Hawkins
 Stuart Bingham 3–2 Jack Lisowski
 Mark Selby 2–3 Barry Hawkins
 Ryan Day 2–3 Jack Lisowski
 Gary Wilson 3–1 Barry Hawkins
 Kyren Wilson 3–0 Ryan Day
 Stuart Bingham 3–2 Mark Selby

 Gary Wilson 3–0 Ryan Day
 Jack Lisowski 1–3 Barry Hawkins
 Kyren Wilson 3–2 Mark Selby
 Stuart Bingham 1–3 Barry Hawkins
 Gary Wilson 0–3 Mark Selby
 Stuart Bingham 3–2 Ryan Day
 Kyren Wilson 3–0 Jack Lisowski

Table

Play-offs

Group 3

 Xiao Guodong 0–3 Tom Ford
 Ben Woollaston 0–3 Graeme Dott
 Kyren Wilson 2–3 Xiao Guodong
 Gary Wilson 3–2 Matthew Selt
 Tom Ford 3–1 Ben Woollaston
 Graeme Dott 2–3 Gary Wilson
 Xiao Guodong 2–3 Ben Woollaston

 Matthew Selt 3–2 Kyren Wilson
 Tom Ford 3–0 Graeme Dott
 Gary Wilson 1–3 Kyren Wilson
 Matthew Selt 0–3 Graeme Dott
 Ben Woollaston 3–1 Kyren Wilson
 Xiao Guodong 2–3 Matthew Selt
 Tom Ford 2–3 Gary Wilson

 Ben Woollaston 1–3 Matthew Selt
 Graeme Dott 2–3 Kyren Wilson
 Xiao Guodong 1–3 Gary Wilson
 Tom Ford 2–3 Kyren Wilson
 Ben Woollaston 1–3 Gary Wilson
 Tom Ford 3–1 Matthew Selt
 Xiao Guodong 3–1 Graeme Dott

Note
Barry Hawkins and Mark Selby withdrew from the tournament prior to group 3 play.

Table

Play-offs

Group 4

 Joe Perry 1–3 Scott Donaldson
 Ali Carter 2–3 Graeme Dott
 Matthew Selt 2–3 Joe Perry
 Tom Ford 2–3 Kyren Wilson
 Scott Donaldson 3–1 Ali Carter
 Graeme Dott 3–2 Tom Ford
 Joe Perry 1–3 Ali Carter

 Kyren Wilson 3–1 Matthew Selt
 Scott Donaldson 3–1 Graeme Dott
 Tom Ford 2–3 Matthew Selt
 Kyren Wilson 3–2 Graeme Dott
 Ali Carter 3–2 Matthew Selt
 Joe Perry 2–3 Kyren Wilson
 Scott Donaldson 2–3 Tom Ford

 Ali Carter 2–3 Kyren Wilson
 Graeme Dott 3–1 Matthew Selt
 Joe Perry 3–0 Tom Ford
 Scott Donaldson 3–0 Matthew Selt
 Ali Carter 1–3 Tom Ford
 Scott Donaldson 3–2 Kyren Wilson
 Joe Perry 2–3 Graeme Dott

Table

Play-offs

Group 5

 Anthony McGill 3–1 David Gilbert
 Mark Williams 3–1 Tom Ford
 Joe Perry 3–1 Anthony McGill
 Kyren Wilson 3–0 Graeme Dott
 David Gilbert 1–3 Mark Williams
 Tom Ford 3–2 Kyren Wilson
 Anthony McGill 0–3 Mark Williams

 Graeme Dott 3–2 Joe Perry
 David Gilbert 3–2 Tom Ford
 Kyren Wilson 3–2 Joe Perry
 Graeme Dott 3–0 Tom Ford
 Mark Williams 3–1 Joe Perry
 Anthony McGill 3–1 Graeme Dott
 David Gilbert 3–0 Kyren Wilson

 Mark Williams 3–2 Graeme Dott
 Tom Ford 2–3 Joe Perry
 Anthony McGill 3–1 Kyren Wilson
 David Gilbert 0–3 Joe Perry
 Mark Williams 3–0 Kyren Wilson
 David Gilbert 3–2 Graeme Dott
 Anthony McGill 1–3 Tom Ford

Table

Play-offs

Group 6

 John Higgins 1–3 Judd Trump
 Mark King 1–3 Graeme Dott
 Mark Williams 2–3 John Higgins
 Joe Perry 1–3 David Gilbert
 Judd Trump 3–1 Mark King
 Graeme Dott 3–1 Joe Perry
 John Higgins 3–2 Mark King

 David Gilbert 3–2 Mark Williams
 Judd Trump 3–1 Graeme Dott
 Joe Perry 2–3 Mark Williams
 David Gilbert 3–2 Graeme Dott
 Mark King 0–3 Mark Williams
 John Higgins 3–1 David Gilbert
 Judd Trump 3–1 Joe Perry

 Mark King 1–3 David Gilbert
 Graeme Dott 3–1 Mark Williams
 John Higgins 1–3 Joe Perry
 Judd Trump 1–3 Mark Williams
 Mark King 1–3 Joe Perry
 Judd Trump 1–3 David Gilbert
 John Higgins 3–2 Graeme Dott

Table

Play-offs

Group 7

 Lyu Haotian 1–3 Robert Milkins
 Ricky Walden 0–3 Mark Williams
 David Gilbert 3–1 Lyu Haotian
 John Higgins 2–3 Graeme Dott
 Robert Milkins 1–3 Ricky Walden
 Mark Williams 0–3 John Higgins
 Lyu Haotian 3–0 Ricky Walden

 Graeme Dott 3–1 David Gilbert
 Robert Milkins 1–3 Mark Williams
 John Higgins 3–0 David Gilbert
 Graeme Dott 1–3 Mark Williams
 Ricky Walden 2–3 David Gilbert
 Lyu Haotian 0–3 Graeme Dott
 Robert Milkins 0–3 John Higgins

 Ricky Walden 3–0 Graeme Dott
 Mark Williams 0–3 David Gilbert
 Lyu Haotian 1–3 John Higgins
 Robert Milkins 2–3 David Gilbert
 Ricky Walden 0–3 John Higgins
 Robert Milkins 0–3 Graeme Dott
 Lyu Haotian 3–2 Mark Williams

Table

Play-offs

Winners' Group

 Neil Robertson 3–1 Stuart Bingham
 Gary Wilson 2–3 Scott Donaldson
 Anthony McGill 2–3 Neil Robertson
 Judd Trump 3–2 Graeme Dott
 Stuart Bingham 3–0 Gary Wilson
 Scott Donaldson 1–3 Judd Trump
 Neil Robertson 3–1 Gary Wilson

 Graeme Dott 2–3 Anthony McGill
 Stuart Bingham 0–3 Scott Donaldson
 Judd Trump 3–2 Anthony McGill
 Graeme Dott 3–2 Scott Donaldson
 Gary Wilson 2–3 Anthony McGill
 Neil Robertson 1–3 Graeme Dott
 Stuart Bingham 1–3 Judd Trump

 Gary Wilson 0–3 Graeme Dott
 Scott Donaldson 0–3 Anthony McGill
 Neil Robertson 0–3 Judd Trump
 Stuart Bingham 3–1 Anthony McGill
 Gary Wilson 1–3 Judd Trump
 Stuart Bingham 0–3 Graeme Dott
 Neil Robertson 1–3 Scott Donaldson

Table

Play-offs

Century breaks
A total of 104 century breaks were made during the event.

 145 (6), 139 (W), 132, 128, 127, 127, 122, 120, 117, 114, 107, 100  Judd Trump
 143 (4), 125, 121, 110, 109, 107, 106, 105, 105, 101, 100, 100, 100  Kyren Wilson
 140, 132, 126, 118, 106, 105, 103, 100  Graeme Dott
 139 (5), 126, 115, 109, 106  Tom Ford
 138, 128, 121, 114, 111  Joe Perry
 138, 117, 105, 103, 101  David Gilbert
 137, 135, 116, 109, 107, 105  Mark Williams
 137, 114, 114, 108  Anthony McGill
 134 (2), 133, 131 (1), 130, 117  Mark Selby
 134 (3), 132, 132, 125, 119, 108, 105, 103, 101, 100  Gary Wilson
 134, 130, 118, 108, 101  Stuart Bingham
 134 (3), 127, 113, 109  Xiao Guodong
 133, 130 (7), 121, 109, 107, 101  John Higgins
 132  Ben Woollaston
 129, 116, 102  Barry Hawkins
 126, 101  Ryan Day
 125  Lyu Haotian
 118, 111  Neil Robertson
 111  Scott Donaldson
 108, 101  Jack Lisowski
 107, 101, 101  Jimmy Robertson
 103  Matthew Selt

Bold: highest break in the indicated group.

Winnings 

Green: Won the group. Bold: Highest break in the group. All prize money in GBP.
Parenthesis: Ranking prior to tournament start, 7 October 2019.

References

External links
 Matchroom Sport – Championship League Snooker
 World Snooker – Calendar 2019/2020

2019 2020
2019 in snooker
2019 in English sport
2020 in snooker
2020 in English sport
October 2019 sports events in the United Kingdom
January 2020 sports events in the United Kingdom
March 2020 sports events in the United Kingdom
2019-20 Championship League